Nodar Djin (January 8, 1947  —  April 4, 2002) was a Georgian-born Russian writer, journalist and philosopher.

Biography
Born in Georgia, lived in Moscow. His grandfather was a rabbi, his father was a lawyer. In 1963 he graduated from the philological faculty of the Tbilisi University, in 1966 at the VGIK. In 1968 he defended his thesis on aesthetics, and in 1977 became the youngest Doctor of Philosophy  in the history of the USSR. He worked at the Institute of Philosophy, Russian Academy of Sciences, at MSU and TSU.

From 1980 he lived in the USA,
where he worked in the field of radio and photojournalism, published books on the philosophy. Professor of Philosophy, in 1981, he won the Rockefeller Prize in Humanities. His documentary  Last Journey, created by his own photographs, won a number of prizes at international film festivals in the United States. Fluent in eight languages.

Author of many studies on philosophy and cultural history, aesthetics and psychology, as well as novels. The American press called him a strikingly versatile and sophisticated intellectual, and The New Republic in connection with his sensational case against the Voice of America radio station, called him  Citizen Djin  by analogy with the hero of the classic film Citizen Kane.

His younger brother is known chess player Roman Dzindzichashvili. His daughter Yana Djin.

References

External links

 Nodar Djin: Fiction
 Нодар Джин. История моего самоубийства
   Нодар Джин в  Журнальном зале 
  Литературная премия имени Нодара Джина

1947 births
2002 deaths
Writers from Tbilisi
Jews from Georgia (country)
Soviet emigrants to the United States
Death in Washington, D.C.
Tbilisi State University alumni
Soviet philosophers
American philosophers
Gerasimov Institute of Cinematography alumni
20th-century Russian journalists

Academic staff of Moscow State University
Academic staff of Tbilisi State University